Dorf Mecklenburg-Bad Kleinen is an Amt in the district of Nordwestmecklenburg, in Mecklenburg-Vorpommern, Germany. The seat of the Amt is in Dorf Mecklenburg.

The Amt Dorf Mecklenburg-Bad Kleinen consists of the following municipalities:
Bad Kleinen 
Barnekow 
Bobitz 
Dorf Mecklenburg
Groß Stieten 
Hohen Viecheln 
Lübow 
Metelsdorf 
Ventschow

References

Ämter in Mecklenburg-Western Pomerania